Tomorrow We Live is the second album by KB. Reach Records released the project on April 21, 2015.

Critical reception

Mentioning in a three and a half star review by Jesus Freak Hideout, Kevin Hoskins realizes, "Tomorrow We Live is solid, carries good themes" despite its drawbacks listeners will still appreciate the tunes. Richard Spadine, indicating in a three and a half star review from Rapzilla, recognizes, "Tomorrow We Live adds up to slightly less than the sum of its parts, the parts themselves are well worth your time." Signaling in a perfect ten review at Cross Rhythms, Tony Cummings responds, "Gospel hip-hop has clearly come of age and this is another gem of an album." Marcus Hathcock, writing a four and a half star review for New Release Tuesday, describes, "this is deep, introspective, challenging material here." Awarding the album four stars from CCM Magazine, Andy Argyrakis says, "Even though his lyrics address struggle and hardship, he always leaves listeners with a Christ-centered promise that hope's right around the corner". Amanda Brogan, specifying in a four and a half review for Christian Music Review, writes, "Tomorrow We Live will provide your answers." Rating the album four stars for The Christian Manifesto, Tyler Martoia says, "it shows that this man is not trying to show himself as just a rapper, but as a true, well-rounded musician." Writing a review for Christian Review Magazine, Leah St. John rating the album five stars, states, "Tomorrow We Live draws you in and makes you long to hear what the next track has to offer, and the next, and so on." David Jeffries of AllMusic, gave the album a three and a half starts by pointing out KB's maturity and musical direction he took on the album saying "fans will appreciate all the musical growth as jazz, R&B, and other genres now figure into KB's rich mix".

Track listing

Charts

References

2015 albums
KB (rapper) albums
Albums produced by Gawvi
Albums produced by Beam
Albums produced by Swoope